Cara Black and Leander Paes were the defending champions, but they lost in the second round to Chan Yung-jan and Paul Hanley.

Katarina Srebotnik and Daniel Nestor won the mixed doubles title at the 2011 Australian Open, defeating Chan and Hanley in the final 6–3, 3–6, [10–7].

Seeds

Draw

Finals

Top half

Bottom half

References

 2011 Australian Open – Doubles draws and results at the International Tennis Federation

Mixed Doubles
Australian Open (tennis) by year – Mixed doubles